Turbo C# is a discontinued integrated development environment (IDE) from Borland that came in two versions, Explorer and Professional. It uses the C# programming language to develop applications for WinForms and ASP.NET.

The free Explorer edition, which had a fixed IDE targeted towards student, amateur, and hobbyist programmers is no longer available.

The Professional edition had an extensible and customizable IDE.

See also
 Turbo C++
 Turbo Delphi
 Turbo C

References

External links
 Borland's official Turbo C# Site

CodeGear software